McComb High School is a public high school in McComb, Ohio.  It is the only high school in the McComb Local Schools district.  The school's mascot is the Panther (or Fighting Panther).  School colors are Black and Red.  They are a member of the Blanchard Valley Conference.

Ohio High School Athletic Association State Championships

 Boys Football – 1983, 2018 
Girls Track and Field - Event: Shot Put (2010, 2011, 2016, 2017), Discus (2013, 2017)

References

External links
 

High schools in Hancock County, Ohio
Public high schools in Ohio